Kåre Ingemar Karlsson (born 28 January 1924) is a Swedish former ski jumper.

He was born in Løkken Verk in Norway, and grew up there with his ski jumper brothers Arthur and Evert Karlsson. They represented the sports club Løkken IF. Kåre Karlsson moved to Örnsköldsvik in his father's home country Sweden in 1944, and joined the club IF Friska Viljor.

He finished 21st at the 1950 World Ski Championships. Three other Løkken IF members (current or former) participated here; Evert Karlsson, Arthur E. Tokle, and Vidar Lindboe-Hansen. At the Swedish Championships, Kåre Karlsson finished sixth in 1945, ninth in 1946, seventh in 1948, second in 1949, and eighth in 1953.

References

1924 births
Living people
People from Meldal
People from Örnsköldsvik Municipality
Swedish people of Norwegian descent
Swedish male ski jumpers
Norwegian emigrants to Sweden
20th-century Swedish people